This page describes the qualifying procedure for the 2010 Individual Speedway Junior World Championship finals.

The 2010 FIM Speedway Under 21 World Championship events took place from April to June 2010. In a new format approved by the International Motorcycling Federation (FIM), there were three final meetings with fourteen permanent riders and two wild cards and two track reserves. The permanent riders was determined in five Qualifying Round and two Semi-Finals.

Qualification system 
In five Qualifying Round was started 80 riders and to Semi-Finals was qualify top 6 from each meetings. This 30 riders and 2 riders from Semi-Final' host federations (Matija Duh of Slovenia and Kevin Wölbert of Germany) was started in two Semi-Finals. The top 7 riders from both SF was automatically qualify for all Final meetings.

Qualifying rounds

Semi-finals

See also 
 2011 Speedway Grand Prix Qualification
 2010 Team Speedway Junior World Championship

References 

Q